Senator Burling may refer to:

Albert E. Burling (1891–1960), New Jersey State Senate
Carroll Burling (born 1934), Nebraska State Senate
George T. Burling (1849–1928), New York State Senate
Peter Burling (politician) (born 1945), New Hampshire State Senate